The Scout and Guide movement in Vanuatu is served by two organisations 
 Vanuatu Girl Guides Association, member of the World Association of Girl Guides and Girl Scouts
 Vanuatu branch of The Scout Association

See also